Man with a Load of Mischief is a musical,

It is based on the play by Ashley Dukes. Book by Ben Tarver music by John Clifton; lyrics by Messrs. Clifton and Tarver; staged by Tom Gruenewald; setting and lighting by Joan Larkey; costumes by Volavkova; Choreography by Noel Schwartz; musical direction by Sande Campbell; orchestrations by Mr. Clifton; Production stage manager, Richard Moss, Produced by Donald H. Goldman.

Original production
Man with a Load of Mischief opened 6 November 1966 at the Jan Hus Playhouse, 351 East 74th Street, New York City.  On 17 May 1967, it transferred to the Provincetown Playhouse, 139 MacDougal Street, where it closed on 4 June after 241 performances.

1966 off-Broadway cast
Innkeeper - Tom Noel
His wife - Lesslie Nicol
Lord - Raymond Thorne
Man - Reid Shelton
Lady - Virginia Vestoff
Maid - Alice Cannon

References

External links
 Man with a Load of Mischief at the Internet Off Broadway Database

1966 musicals
Off-Broadway musicals
Musicals based on plays